The 2021–22 American Eagles men's basketball team represented American University in the 2021–22 NCAA Division I men's basketball season. The Eagles, led by eighth-year head coach Mike Brennan, played their home games at Bender Arena in Washington, D.C. as members of the Patriot League. They finished the season 10–22, 5–13 in Patriot League play to finish in a tie for last place. As the No. 10 seed in the Patriot League tournament, they defeated Holy Cross in the first round before losing to Navy in the quarterfinals.

Previous season
In a season limited due to the ongoing COVID-19 pandemic, the Eagles finished the 2020–21 season 4–6, 4–5 in Patriot League play to finish in second place in the South division. As the No. 5 seed in the Patriot League tournament, they lost to Army in the quarterfinals.

Roster

Schedule and results

|-
!colspan=12 style=| Non-conference regular season

|-
!colspan=9 style=| Patriot League regular season

|-
!colspan=9 style=| Patriot League tournament

Source

References

American Eagles men's basketball seasons
American Eagles
American Eagles men's basketball
American Eagles men's basketball